Norwalk station may refer to:

 Norwalk station (Los Angeles Metro), a Los Angeles County Metro Rail station in Norwalk, California, United States
 Norwalk/Santa Fe Springs station, a Metrolink commuter rail station in Norwalk, California, United States
 South Norwalk station, a Metro-North commuter rail station and transportation hub in Norwalk, Connecticut, United States
 East Norwalk station, a Metro-North commuter rail station in Norwalk, Connecticut, United States